Nelliston Historic District is a national historic district located at Nelliston in Montgomery County, New York. It includes 56 contributing buildings.  It encompasses three of Nelliston's residential streets developed between 1860 and 1890.  It also includes the area along the railroad tracks containing two freight houses and the 1902 railroad station.  Notable residential structures include the Abram Nellis Mansion; a brick two story Italianate style dwelling dated to the 1860s.

It was listed on the National Register of Historic Places in 1980.

References

Historic districts on the National Register of Historic Places in New York (state)
Italianate architecture in New York (state)
National Register of Historic Places in Montgomery County, New York